Takayoshi Ishihara (石原 崇兆, born November 17, 1992) is a Japanese football player who plays as a midfielder for Zweigen Kanazawa from 2023.

Career
Ishihara begin first youth career with Shimizu S-Pulse as youth team.

Ishihara begin first professional career with Fagiano Okayama in 2011. After four years at Shimizu, he leave from the club in 2014.

On 7 January 2015, Ishihara signed transfer to Matsumoto Yamaga ahead of 2015 season.

On 28 December 2018, Ishihara joined to Vegalta Sendai from 2019. He leave from the club in 2022 after four years at Sendai

On 13 December 2022, Ishihara officially transfer to J2 club, Zweigen Kanazawa for upcoming 2023 season.

Career statistics
Updated to the end 2022 season.

Club

References

External links

Profile at Matsumoto Yamaga

1992 births
Living people
Association football people from Shizuoka Prefecture
Japanese footballers
J1 League players
J2 League players
Fagiano Okayama players
Matsumoto Yamaga FC players
Vegalta Sendai players
Zweigen Kanazawa players
Association football midfielders